Robert Marsack Manser (10 October 1880 – 15 February 1955) was an English first-class cricketer.

Manser represented Hampshire in a single first-class match against the touring South Africans at the Municipal Ground, Alton in 1904.

In 1909 Manser joined Dorset, representing the club in the 1909 Minor Counties Championship. Manser made his Dorset debut against the Surrey Second XI, playing regularly for the county until the 1913 season.

After the end of the First World War, Manser returned to playing for Dorset in 1920, with the last of his 35 Minor Counties Championship matches for Dorset coming in 1929 against Hertfordshire.

Manser died at Parkstone, Dorset on 15 February 1955.

External links
Robert Manser at Cricinfo
Robert Manser at CricketArchive

1880 births
1955 deaths
People from Royal Tunbridge Wells
English cricketers
Hampshire cricketers
Dorset cricketers